Yuelushannus is a small genus of east Asian sheet weavers. It was first described by M. Irfan, G. C. Zhou and S. Bashir in 2020, and it has only been found in the Hunan and Hubei provinces of China. The genus name is derived from the type locality, Yuelu Mountain in the province of Hunan.  it contains only two species: Y. alatus and Y. barbatus.

See also
 List of Linyphiidae species (Q–Z)

References

Linyphiidae genera
Spiders of China